Shotgun Messiah is the self-titled first album by Swedish hard rock group Shotgun Messiah, released in 1989 on Relativity Records.

Track listing
"Bop City" - 3:54
"Don't Care 'bout Nothin'" - 4:20
"Shout It Out" - 4:11
"Squeezin' Teazin'" - 4:05
"The Explorer" - 3:52
"Nowhere Fast" - 3:59
"Dirt Talk" - 4:30
"I'm Your Love" - 4:53
"Nervous" - 4:07
"Carnival Exit" - 0:38

Personnel
Zinny J. Zan – vocals
Harry K. Cody – guitars
Tim Tim (Tim Sköld) – bass
Stixx Galore – drums

Additional musicians: Tord Jacobsson drums on "The Explorer".

Produced by Harry Cody and Tim Tim.

Assistant Producers & (1st) Engineers: Bill Freesh & Matt Olausson.

Studios: CCM, KMH, Can AM

Notes: The CD and Tape included a Shotgun Messiah Stencil.

References

1989 debut albums
Shotgun Messiah albums